The 1998 Indian general election polls in Tamil Nadu were held for 39 seats in the state. New elections were called when Indian National Congress (INC) left the United Front government led by I. K. Gujral, after they refused to drop the regional Dravida Munnetra Kazhagam (DMK) party from the government after the DMK was linked by an investigative panel to Sri Lankan separatists blamed for the killing of Rajiv Gandhi. The result was a landslide victory for the National Democratic Alliance (NDA) winning 29 seats, which helped result in Atal Bihari Vajpayee being sworn in as the 16th Prime Minister of India. J. Jayalalithaa and the All India Anna Dravida Munnetra Kazhagam, broke off from their long alliance with Indian National Congress and formed an alliance with Bharatiya Janata Party, by joining the National Democratic Alliance. This state proved to be very important in determining the prime minister, since the 18 seats of AIADMK proved valuable for BJP to hold power. That was short-lived, since the AIADMK left the alliance in less than a year, and BJP lost the vote of confidence resulting in fresh elections being called.

Seat allotments
Source: Frontline

United Front

Note: Even though CPI(M) originally wanted to contest in support of the United Front, it decided to contest alone when only 1 seat (Coimbatore) was offered. After the fallout, CPM wanted to contest 6 seats in Tamil Nadu on its own, but eventually only contested 2 seats and decided to support DMK-TMC front in the other 37 seats. This was done to keep out the possibility of any vote splitting that might result in NDA gaining seats.

National Democratic Alliance
Source: Indian Express

Congress alliance

Voting and results

Results by Alliance

|-
! style="background-color:#E9E9E9" colspan=2 |Alliance/Party
! style="background-color:#E9E9E9;text-align:right;" |Seats won
! style="background-color:#E9E9E9;text-align:right;" |Change†
! style="background-color:#E9E9E9;text-align:right;" |Popular vote
! style="background-color:#E9E9E9;text-align:right;" |Vote %
! style="background-color:#E9E9E9;text-align:right;" |Adj. %‡
|-
! colspan=2 style="text-align:center;vertical-align:middle;background-color:#FF9933; color:white"|NDA
| 30
| +30
| 12,272,434
| colspan=2 style="text-align:center;vertical-align:middle;"| 47.9%
|-
|AIADMK
! style="background-color: #009900" |
| 18 	
| +18
| 6,731,550
| 26.3%
| 46.9%
|-
|PMK
! style="background-color: #800080" |
| 4 	
| +4
| 1,548,976
| 6.0%
| 47.9%
|-
|BJP
! style="background-color: #FF9933" |
| 3
| +3
| 1,757,645
| 6.9%
| 
|-
|MDMK
! style="background-color: #FF00FF" |
| 3	
| +3
| 1,602,504
| 6.3%
| 45.8%
|-
|JP
! style="background-color: #FFFF00" |
| 1
| +1
| 266,202	
| 1.0%
| 40.5%
|-
|IND
! style="background-color: lime" |
| 1
| +1
| 365,557
| 1.4%
| 55.5%
|-
! colspan=2 style="text-align:center;vertical-align:middle;background-color:#FF0000; color:white"|UF
| 9
| -30
| 10,937,809
| colspan=2 style="text-align:center;vertical-align:middle;"| 42.7%
|-
|DMK
! style="background-color: #FF0000" |
| 5	 	 	
| -12
| 5,140,266
| 20.1%
| 43.6%
|-
|TMC(M)
! style="background-color: teal" |
| 3
| -17
| 5,169,183	
| 20.2%
| 41.6%
|-
|CPI
! style="background-color: #0000FF" |
| 1	
| -1
| 628,360
| 2.5%
| 
|-
! colspan=2 style="text-align:center;vertical-align:middle;background-color:#009900; color:white"|INC+
| 0
| –
| 1,511,444
| colspan=2 style="text-align:center;vertical-align:middle;"| 5.9%
|-
|INC
! style="background-color: " |
| 0  	
| –
| 1,223,102
| 4.8%
| 
|-
|MADMK
! style="background-color: " |
| 0
| –
| 278,324
| 1.1%
| 14.2%
|-
|UCPI
! style="background-color: " |
| 0
| –
| 10,018
| 0.03%
| 1.6%
|-
! colspan=2 style="text-align:center;vertical-align:middle;background-color:gray; color:white"|Others
| 0
| –
| 984,733
| colspan=2 style="text-align:center;vertical-align:middle;"| 3.8%
|-
|CPI(M)
! style="background-color: " |
| 0  	
| –
| 161,452
| 0.6%
| 
|-
|IND
! style="background-color: " |
| 0
| –
| 265,029 	
| 1.0%
| 
|-
| style="text-align:center;" |Total
! style="background-color: " |
| 39
| –
| 25,603,798
| 100%
| style="text-align:center;" | –
|-
|}
†: Seat change represents seats won in terms of the current alliances, which is considerably different from the last election. ‡: Vote % reflects the percentage of votes the party received compared to the entire electorate in Tamil Nadu that voted in this election. Adjusted (Adj.) Vote %, reflects the % of votes the party received per constituency that they contested.
Sources: Election Commission of India

List of Elected MPs

c-indicates sitting/incumbent M.P. from previous Lok Sabha (1996–1998)

Post-election Union Council of Ministers from Tamil Nadu
Source: The Tribune

Cabinet Ministers

 Note: R. Muthiah resigned in just 20 days in office, due to his assets coming into question by the high court in Madras. In a year, cabinet ministers M. Thambidurai resigned along with M.R. Janarthanam, who was the replacement of R. Muthiah, as part of AIADMK's withdrawal from NDA, to start up fresh elections in 1999. Vazhappady Ramamurthy also refused to quit his cabinet ministership, and quit his relationship with AIADMK while keeping its relationship with NDA.

Ministers of State (Independent charge)

Ministers of State

See also
Elections in Tamil Nadu

Bibliography
Volume I, 1998 Indian general election, 12th Lok Sabha

External links
 Website of Election Commission of India
 CNN-IBN Lok Sabha Election History
 Of Polls and Prediction

1998 Indian general election
1998
1990s in Tamil Nadu